Claypole is a village and civil parish in the South Kesteven district of Lincolnshire, England. The population of the civil parish at the 2011 census was 1,382.

The name Claypole is from the Old English '' and 'pol', for "clayey pool". The village is recorded in the Domesday Book as "Claipol" and as having a church, a priest and one mill.

Location and amenities
The county of Nottinghamshire forms the western and northern borders of the parish, with Fenton and Stubton parishes to the east and Dry Doddington to the south; the River Witham flows by the west side of the village.

The East Coast Main Line passes close to the north-east of the village, with three level crossings, including one on Osterfen Lane and another on Stubton Road.

Claypole primary school is on School Lane. Next to the school is a cricket and football field, home to local teams. In the early 1900s public benefactor Harry Coulby gifted the village school and village hall, and built an American-style house.

Claypole's Grade I listed Anglican parish church is dedicated to St Peter and dates from c.1300. Although the church is now known as St Peter's, early records refer to it as St Peter's and St Paul's which is likely to have been its 
original dedication. There was a church in the village in Saxon times, probably built from wood. The church bears over 300 marks in its stonework, some of which have existed for over 300 years. These include Masons Marks, circles, letters and dates, faces, crosses and even a medieval game.

The village public house is the Five Bells Inn on Main Street, and there is a butchers on Doddington Lane.

Gallery

References

External links

 "Claypole", Genuki.org.uk
 Parish Council
 Claypole Cricket Club
 Claypole Warriors JFC
 Claypole Village Hall

Villages in Lincolnshire
Civil parishes in Lincolnshire
South Kesteven District